Always and Never is the debut album by New Zealand pop punk band, Goodnight Nurse, released in January 2006.

Album information 
The album spawned many singles and radio hits, including, "My Only", "Death Goes To Disco", "Loner", "Our Song", "Going Away", "Taking Over", and "All For You" (most songs from the album were released as singles).

Always and Never went Gold after only a week of release and debuted to place number 5 on the RIANZ New Zealand Top 40 Albums Chart. From then on, the album stayed in the Top 40 for 5 weeks (from 30 January until 27 February).

New Zealand critics took notice of the tight riffs and hooks, wide range of subject matter, and musical diversity (the album included fast, punk songs, as well as more mature-sounding songs that deal with themes such as death).

Joel Little, the lead singer, said, when asked about the subject matter of the album:

Track listing 
 "Welcome To Hell" featuring Ben's Choir – 0:48
 "My Only" – 2:29
 "Death Goes to Disco" – 3:34
 "All Hail The Serpent Queen Part 1; Trilogy" – 2:48
 "Take My Hand" – 3:38
 "Loner" – 2:18
 "No Way To Escape" – 3:13
 "Our Song" – 3:51
 "A Shadow And A Prayer" – 3:48
 "Suffocating Slow" – 3:08
 "Suffer" – 3:10
 "Massacre Begins Tonight" – 3:30
 "All For You" featuring Kimbra Johnson – 4:56
 "Milkshake" (Bonus) – 2:28

Alternate track listing 
 "Welcome To Hell" featuring Ben's Choir – 0:48
 "My Only" – 2:29
 "Death Goes to Disco" – 3:34
 "All Hail The Serpent Queen Part 1; Trilogy" – 2:48
 "Take My Hand" – 3:38
 "Loner" – 2:18
 "No Way To Escape" – 3:13
 "Our Song" – 3:51
 "A Shadow And A Prayer" – 3:48
 "Going Away" – 3:17
 "Suffer" – 3:10
 "Taking Over" – 3:03
 "All For You" (Bonus) – 15:10

Charts

Singles

Music videos 
Every song from Always and Never which was released as a single has an accompanying video, all of which are available on YouTube.
 'Death Goes To Disco' Music Video
 'Taking Over' Music Video
 'Going Away' Music Video
 'Our Song' Music Video
 'My Only' Music Video
 'Loner' Music Video
 'All For You' Music Video

References 

2006 debut albums
Goodnight Nurse albums
Festival Records albums